Stronger Together, Tous Ensemble was a 90-minute Canadian benefit concert which aired on April 26, 2020, during the COVID-19 pandemic and a week after the 2020 Nova Scotia attacks. The program drew an audience of over 11,500,000 viewers and listeners, and was simulcast by every major Canadian television broadcast company, including Bell Media (CTV), Canadian Broadcasting Corporation (CBC Television), Rogers Media (Citytv), Corus Entertainment (Global), V, and numerous other television, radio, and Internet-based broadcast platforms. This made it both the largest multi-platform broadcast and highest viewed non-sporting broadcast in Canadian television history. Numerous singers, actors, athletes, charities, and those impacted by coronavirus were featured including remarks by Prime Minister Justin Trudeau. Over  in donations during the event were raised for Food Banks Canada.

Production
Stronger Together, Tous Ensemble is primarily composed of homemade video from various celebrities' households, singing or giving words of encouragement. The program was created in collaboration to unite viewers during the COVID-19 pandemic and after the 2020 Nova Scotia attacks.

Broadcasters
The benefit concert aired on 120 different radio, television, and online platforms.

On television, the concert was broadcast on English-language stations CTV, CBC Television, Citytv, and Global. It was also broadcast on French-language station V. The special was also simulcast on networks owned by Bell Media (CP24, CTV 2, MTV, Much, TSN, and Vrak), the Canadian Broadcasting Corporation (Ici ARTV and Unis), Rogers Media (FX and Omni Television), Corus Entertainment (ABC Spark, National Geographic, SériesPlus, and Slice), Asian Television Network (ATN HD, ATN Bangla, ATN Cricket Plus, ATN Food Food, ATN Gujarati, ATN Jaya TV, ATN Life, ATN PM One, ATN Punjabi Plus, and CBN), Blue Ant Media (A.Side TV, BBC Earth, Cottage Life, HIFI, Love Nature, Makeful, and Smithsonian Channel), and Stingray Group (Stingray Hits! and Stingray Retro), as well as networks such as APTN, Family Channel, Hollywood Suite, NTV, OutTV, and Super Channel Fuse.

On radio, the concert was simulcast on CBC Music, CBC Radio One, EZ Rock, Sirius XM channel 169, and Virgin Radio, and select stations owned by Arctic Radio, Bell Media Radio, Blackburn Radio, First Peoples Radio, Harvard Broadcasting, Jim Pattison Group, Rawlco Communications, Stingray Radio, and Vista Radio.

The concert was also streamed on numerous websites, streaming services, and on-demand services, including CBC Gem, CBC Listen, Crave, Ici TOU.TV, Stingray Qello, Super Channel On Demand, and the websites and apps of the CBC, CTV, Citytv, Entertainment Tonight Canada, Global, Global News, and iHeartRadio Canada.

Featuring
Stronger Together, Tous Ensemble began with Sam Roberts cover of "We're All In This Together" with his family and subsequently featured numerous singers, actors, athletes, charities, victims of the COVID-19 pandemic, politicians, and Canadian personalities. It concluded with a twenty-seven artist collaboration of "Lean on Me", and closing remarks by Justin Trudeau and Drake.

Musical performances

Lean on Me
Near the end of the broadcast, twenty-seven artists collaborated on a bilingual rendition of "Lean on Me" as a tribute to Bill Withers following his death a month earlier. The rendition is a product of an initiative by Tyler Shaw and Fefe Dobson called ArtistsCAN, and was released separately to raise funds for the Canadian Red Cross.

 Tyler Shaw
 Fefe Dobson
 Johnny Orlando
 Michael Bublé
 Justin Bieber
 Sarah McLachlan
 The Tenors
 Avril Lavigne
 Bryan Adams
 Command Sisters
 Serena Ryder
 Geddy Lee
 Buffy Sainte-Marie
 Jann Arden
 Marie-Mai
 Walk off the Earth
 Dan Kanter
 Desiire
 Donovan Woods
 Josh Ramsay
 Olivia Lunny
 Jules Halpern
 Scott Helman
 Ryland James
 Shawn Hook
 TIKA
 Bad Child

Other appearances

Impacts

The program became the most watched non-sporting event in Canadian television history.

The special won the Canadian Screen Award for Best Entertainment News Program or Series at the 9th Canadian Screen Awards in 2021.

See also
 2020 in Canadian television#April
 Together at Home

References

2020 in Canadian television
COVID-19 pandemic benefit concerts
Canadian television specials
2020 television specials
Television series by Insight Productions
Television shows about the COVID-19 pandemic
COVID-19 pandemic in Canada
Simulcasts
Canadian Screen Award-winning television shows